Samuel Bowden (1846–unknown) was a corporal in the United States Army who received the Medal of Honor for his actions during the Indian Wars.

Early life
Samuel was born in Salem, Massachusetts, in 1846. He was a corporal in Company M, 6th US Cavalry when he displayed actions near the Wichita River, Texas, that would earn him the Medal of Honor. The citation reads:

Medal of Honor
Rank and organization: Corporal, Company M, 6th US Cavalry. Place and date: Near Wichita River, Texas, October 5, 1870. Birth: Salem, Massachusetts. Date of issue: November 19, 1870.

Citation:
Gallantry in pursuit of and fight with Indians.

Later life
Samuel received the Medal of Honor on November 19, 1870, and the date of his death is unknown, as well as his final resting place.

See also
 List of Medal of Honor recipients
 List of Medal of Honor recipients for the Indian Wars

References

1846 births
Recipients of the Medal of Honor
American Indian Wars recipients of the Medal of Honor
People from Massachusetts
Year of death missing